Founders Hall may refer to:

Founders Hall (Pittsfield, Maine), listed on the NRHP in Maine
Founders Hall, Heidelberg College, Tiffin, OH, listed on the NRHP in Ohio
a building in, or the area of, or something to do with Cornell West Campus
Founders Hall (Prince Edward Island), Charlottetown, Prince Edward Island
Naval War College Museum, Newport, Rhode Island, also called Founders Hall

Architectural disambiguation pages